André Michaux, also styled Andrew Michaud, (8 March 174611 October 1802) was a French botanist and explorer. He is most noted for his study of North American flora. In addition Michaux collected specimens in England, Spain, France, and even Persia. His work was part of a larger European effort to gather knowledge about the natural world. Michaux's contributions include Histoire des chênes de l'Amérique (1801; "The Oaks of North America") and Flora Boreali-Americana (1803; "The Flora of North America") which continued to be botanical references well into the 19th century. His son, François André Michaux, also became an authoritative botanist.

Biography

Michaux was born in Satory, part of Versailles, Yvelines, where his father managed farmland on the king's estate. Michaux was trained in the agricultural sciences in anticipation of his one-day assuming his father's duties, and received a basic classical 18th century education, including Latin and some Greek, until he was fourteen. In 1769, he married Cecil Claye, the daughter of a prosperous farmer; she died a year later giving birth to their son, François André. Michaux then took up the study of botany and became a student of Bernard de Jussieu. In 1779 he spent time studying botany in England, and in 1780 he explored Auvergne, the Pyrenees and northern Spain. In 1782 he was sent by the French government as secretary to the French consul on a botanical mission to Persia. His journey began unfavourably, as he was robbed of all his equipment except his books; but he gained influential support in Persia after curing the shah of a dangerous illness. After two years he returned to France with a fine herbarium, and also introduced numerous Eastern plants into the botanical gardens of France.

André Michaux was appointed by Louis XVI as Royal botanist under the General Director of the Bâtiments du Roi and sent to the United States in 1785 with an annual salary of 2000 livres, to make the first organized investigation of plants that could be of value in French building and carpentry, medicine and agriculture. He traveled with his son François André Michaux (1770–1855) through Canada and the United States. In 1786, Michaux attempted to establish a horticultural garden of thirty acres in Bergen's Wood on the Hudson Palisades near Hackensack, New Jersey. The garden, overseen by Pierre-Paul Saunier from the Jardin des Plantes, Paris, who had emigrated with Michaux, failed because of the harsh winters. In 1787, Michaux established and maintained for a decade a botanical garden of 111 acres near what is now Aviation Avenue in North Charleston, South Carolina, from which he made many expeditions to various parts of North America. 
Michaux described and named many North American species during this time. Between 1785 and 1791 he shipped ninety cases of plants and many seeds to France. At the same time he introduced many species to America from various parts of the world, including Camellia, tea-olive, and crepe myrtle.

After the collapse of the French monarchy, André Michaux, who was a royal botanist, lost his source of income. He actively lobbied the American Philosophical Society to support his next exploration. His efforts paid off and, in early 1793, Thomas Jefferson asked him to undertake an  expedition of westward exploration, similar to the Lewis and Clark Expedition, the Corps of Discovery, conducted by Meriwether Lewis and William Clark a decade later. At the time of the planned Michaux expedition, Lewis was an 18-year-old protégé of Jefferson who asked to be included in the expedition, and was turned down by Jefferson.

Before Michaux set out, however, he volunteered to assist the French Minister to America, Edmond-Charles Genet. Genet was engaging in war-like acts against English and Spanish naval interests, aggravating relations between America, England and Spain. George Rogers Clark offered to organize and lead a militia to take over Louisiana territory from the Spanish. Michaux's mission was to evaluate Clark's plan and coordinate between Clark's actions and Genet's. Michaux went to Kentucky, but, without adequate funds, Clark was unable to raise the militia and the plan eventually folded. It is not true, as sometimes reported, that Thomas Jefferson ordered Michaux to leave the United States after he learned of his involvement with Genet. Though Jefferson did not support Genet's actions, he was aware of Genet's instructions for Michaux and even provided Michaux with letters of introduction to the Governor of Kentucky.

On his return to France in 1796 he was shipwrecked, however most of his specimens survived. His two American gardens declined. Saunier, his salary unpaid, cultivated potatoes and hay and paid taxes on the New Jersey property, which is now still remembered as "The Frenchman's Garden", part of Machpelah Cemetery in North Bergen.

In 1800, Michaux sailed with Nicolas Baudin's expedition to Australia, but left the ship in Mauritius. He then went to Madagascar to investigate the flora of that island. Michaux died at Tamatave in Madagascar of a tropical fever at around 9 a.m. on 11 October 1802. His work as a botanist was chiefly done in the field, and he added largely to what was previously known of the botany of the East and of America.

In 1800, on his visit to the United States, Pierre Samuel Du Pont de Nemours, concerned about the abandoned botanical gardens, wrote to the Institut de France, who sent over Michaux's son François André Michaux to sell the properties. He sold the garden near Charleston, but the concern expressed by Du Pont and his son Eleuthère Irénée du Pont preserved the New Jersey garden in Saunier's care and continued to support it. Saunier continued to send seeds to France for the rest of his life, and is credited with introducing into gardens the chinquapin (Castanea pumila) and the smoking bean tree (Catalpa bignonioides).

Aaron Burr recorded meeting Michaux in Paris on September 17, 1810, but this was apparently Francois Andre Michaux, the son.  According to Burr he went "to Michaux's, the botanist, who was many years in the United States, and has written a valuable little book of his travels. He is now publishing his account of our trees, which will be extremely interesting. It demonstrates that we (not the whole continent, but the United States alone) have three times the number of useful trees that Europe can boast..."  Burr's cited quote would apply equally to both Michaux', father and son, and perhaps more to the son, who had been in America a total of some 6 years, and had recently (1804) written about his travels in America, and was subsequently working on his later opus on American trees.

Legacy
 Carolina lily (Lilium michauxii), Michaux's saxifrage (Saxifraga michauxii), and several other plants are named for him. 
Michaux State Forest in Pennsylvania (U.S.), which protects over 344 square kilometers (over 85,000 acres), is named for him. 
André-Michaux Ecological Reserve in Quebec, Canada, which protects 450 hectares, is named for him.
His son François André Michaux published an Histoire des arbres forestiers de l'Amérique septentrionale (3 vols., 1810–1813), with 156 plates, of which an English translation appeared in 1817-1819 as The North American Sylva.
Michaux Stone — Michaux brought a boundary stone or kudurru back from his Near Eastern trip.  It was originally found by a French physician living in Baghdad, near the site of a 12th-century BCE Babylonian town named Bak-da-du. On a small part of an embankment on the Tigris—near the Al-Karkh end of the Baab El-Maudham Bridge—is another archeological site attributed to the second Babylonian period, circa 600 BCE.  Michaux sold the kudurru to the "Institute Constituting the Commission for Scientific Travel and the Custodians of the Museum of Antiquities in France in 1800, for 1200 francs.  The 'Michaux stone' or Caillou Michaux was then placed in the Cabinet des Médailles of the Bibliothèque Nationale at that time.

Writings
Michaux wrote two valuable works on North American plants: the Histoire des chênes de l'Amérique septentrionale (1801), with 36 plates, and the Flora Boreali-Americana (2 vols., 1803), with 51 plates. Although this 1803 work appeared to be the work of the father, François claimed some 15 years later that the work had been completed after his father's death and published posthumously by himself and another botanist.

See also
 
 European and American voyages of scientific exploration
 François Cagnet

Notes

References
References

Savage, Henry (1959). Discovering America 1700–1875. Harper & Row, 70–73. .

Further Reading
Fishman, Gail (2001). Journeys Through Paradise. University Press of Florida.
Michaux, André (2020). André Michaux in North America: journals and letters, 1785-1797 / translated from the French, edited, and annotated by Charlie Williams, Eliane M. Norman & Walter Kingsley Taylor; with a foreword by James E. McClellan III. University of Alabama Press.
Pluchet, Régis (2014), L'extraordinaire voyage d'un botaniste en Perse, ed. Privat, Toulouse.
Savage, Henry Jr. and Elizabeth J. Savage (1986). André and François André Michaux. University Press of Virginia.

Sources

External links

 Daniel Stowe Botanical Garden: André Michaux
 Biodiversity Heritage Library: books by André Michaux

French taxonomists
1746 births
1802 deaths
Bryologists
Pteridologists
Botanists active in North America
Botanists with author abbreviations
People of colonial New Jersey
North Charleston, South Carolina
People from Versailles
18th-century French botanists
18th-century French writers
18th-century French male writers